The Hugin is a reconstructed longship located at Pegwell Bay in Kent, England. It was a gift from the Danish government commemorating the 1500th anniversary of the arrival of Hengist and Horsa, leaders of the Anglo-Saxon invasion, at nearby Ebbsfleet. The ship is a replica of the much later ca. 890 Gokstad ship.

The boat was built in Denmark whence it was sailed by 53 Danes to England in 1949. The ship landed at Viking Bay in Broadstairs, Kent, before returning to Denmark. In 1950 a copy was presented to the people of Thanet by the King of Denmark and placed in its current location. In 2005 the ship underwent major repairs by Thanet District Council assisted with EU funding.

Hugin’s arrival was presented in a newsreel short entitled "Kent Welcomes Viking Invaders", which British Pathé has uploaded to the internet. Footage from the newsreel was used in the 1965 Doctor Who serial The Time Meddler to represent an 11th-century Viking raiding party.

Further reading
 J Røjel (1949) The 1949 Cruise of the Viking Ship "Hugin". Samlerens forlag

References

External links

Article on Hugin
Video of Hugin being presented by Prince Georg of Denmark, 1950

Medieval Denmark
Ships of England
Ships built in Denmark
Viking ship replicas